Abd al-Qadir al-Maraghi b. Ghaybi (born middle of 14th – died 1435 AD), was a Persian musician and artist. According to the Encyclopedia of Islam, he "was the greatest of the Persian writers on music". According to Kubilay Kolukırık, Al-Maraghi is regarded as a "very important musician whose name is frequently mentioned in the development process of Turkic music history". His works seem to have also played an important role in most related music of the Middle East.

Life
Abd al- Qadir b. GHaybi al-Hafiz al-Maraghi was born in Maragheh in about the middle of the 14th century.  He had become one of the court minstrels of the Jalayirid Sultan al-Husayn around 1379.  Under Sultan Ahmad Jalayirid, he was appointed the chief court minstrel.  When Timur captured Baghdad in 1393, he was transported to Samarqand, which was the capital of the Timurid dynasty.  In 1399, he was in Tabriz at the service of Timur's wayward son Miranshah.  Abdl al-Qadir was blamed for the erratic conducts of Miranshah, and Timur acted swiftly in order to capture him.  But Abd al-Qadir, was forewarned and escaped to the Jalayrid court of Sultan Ahmad in Baghdad.  Timur again recaptured Baghdad in 1401 and took Abd al-Qadir back to Samarqand.  Abd al-Qadir became one of the brilliant men at the court of Timur's son, Shahrukh .  In 1421, he also wrote a musical treatise (see below) for the Ottoman Sultan Murad II.  He died in Samarqand in 1435.

Works on music theory
Abd al-Qadir was proficient in music, poetry and painting.  This made him to be a highly desired artisan amongst the courts of different dynasties.  It was due to his musical talent that he was named by his contemporaries as the Glory of the past age.

Abd al-Qadir is known for his four works on music theory.  All three surviving works were written in Persian.  His most important treatise on music is the Jami al-Alhan (Arabic for Encyclopedia of Music), autographs of which are preserved at the Bodleian Library and the Nuruosmaniye Mosque Library in Istanbul. The first manuscript of this work was written in 1405 for his Nur al-din Abd al-Rahman was revised by the author in 1413. The second manuscript was written in 1415, carries a dedication to Sultan Sharukh of the Timurid dynasty.

The second major work of Abd al-Qadir is the Persian book Maqasid al-Alhan (Arabic for: Purports of Music)(). It was dedicated to the Ottoman Sultan Murad II.

A third treatise on music, the Kanz al-Tu.af (Treasury of Music) which contained the author's notated compositions, has not survived.

His last work, the Sharh al-Adwar (Commentary on the [Kitab al-Adwar] of Safi al-Din al-Urmawi), is to be found in the Nuruosmaniye Mosque Library in Istanbul.

Linguistic significance
Hamdallah Mustawafi of the 13th century AD mentions the language of Maragheh as "Pahlavi Mughayr" (modified Pahlavi):

The 17th century AD Ottoman Turkish traveler Evliya Chelebi who traveled to Safavid Iran also states:

“The majority of the women in Maragheh converse in Pahlavi”.

According to the Encyclopedia of Islam:"At the present day, the inhabitants speak Adhar Turkish, but in the 14th century they still spoke “arabicized Pahlawi” (Nuzhat al-Qolub: Pahlawi Mu’arrab) which means an Iranian dialect of the north western group."

Abd al-Qadir Maraghi not only recorded songs in Persian Language, but also in Arabic, Mongolian, Turkish (Khatai, Chagatay) as well as various regional Iranian dialects (Fahlaviyyat) of Hamadan, Mazandaran, Qazvin, Tabriz, and Rayy.  Thus his work gives us a better view of the regional dialects of Iran.

Four quatrains titled fahlaviyyat from Khwaja Muhammad Kojjani (d. 677/1278-79); born in Kojjan or Korjan, a village near Tabriz, recorded by Abd-al-Qader Maraghi.
A sample of one of the four quatrains from Khwaja Muhammad Kojjani
.

Two qet'as (poems) quoted by Abd-al-Qader Maraghi in the dialect of Tabrz (d. 838/1434-35; II, p. 142).
A sample of one these poems

Current Performances
 Anwar, on the footsteps of Maraghi  (Ensemble Maraghi and Sepideh Raissadat)

See also
List of Persian poets and authors
Persian literature
 Dastgah
 Persian literature
 Persian traditional music
 Persian culture
 Persian Symphonic Music
 List of Iranian composers

References

External References
 Abd al-Qadir Maraghi's Biography
 Lecture: Music Production in the 14th/15th Century Jalayirid and Timurid Courts: The Life and Legacy of Abd al-Qadir Maraghi
 Abd al-Qadir Maraghi, WorldCat
 books
 Abd al-Qadir Maraghi, IMDb

Further reading
 
 
 
 
 
 
 
  

 
 
 

1435 deaths
Iranian writers
Iranian musicians
Azerbaijani writers
Azerbaijani musicians
14th-century births
People from Maragheh
15th-century Iranian people
14th-century Iranian people
People from the Timurid Empire
Jalayirid-period poets